A100, A.100 or A-100 may refer to:
 A-100 Class, the colloquial name given to the introductory/orientation training class for incoming Foreign Service Officers
 A-100 (multiple rocket launcher), a 10 tube multiple rocket launcher used by the People's Liberation Army of China
 A100 road (England), a part of the London Inner Ring Road
 A100 road (Malaysia), a road in Perak connecting Kuala Kurau and Jalan Gula-Jalan Semanggol
 A-100 Rocket, the artillery for the A-100 multiple rocket launcher.
 Aero A.100, a 1933 Czechoslovakian biplane light bomber and reconnaissance aircraft
 Astra A-100, a 1990 Spanish double-action/single-action semi-automatic pistol
 Beriev A-100, an airborne early warning and control (AWACS) aircraft under development for the Russian Air Force
 Bundesautobahn 100, a ring-road enclosing the city centre of Berlin
 Doepfer A-100, a German synthesizer
 Dodge A100, a Dodge van
 Intel A100, one branding of the ultra low-power mobile Stealey processor by Intel
 DSLR-A100 aka Sony α100, Sony's first digital SLR camera with A-mount
 A100 Ampere (microarchitecture) GPGPU by nVidia
 Sony NW-A100, a Walkman digital audio player